It is not clear what the sign language or languages are in Rwanda. In 2006, a dictionary project was started to standardize Rwandan Sign Language (Amarenga y'Ikinyarwanda AKR "Kinyarwanda Sign Language"; also Amarenga yo mu Rwanda AMR "Sign Language of Rwanda"), published in 2009.

However, the project was an incomplete effort, and an expanded dictionary, based on signs common throughout the country, was started in 2013. The latter project description implies that these are dialects of a single language, but that is uncertain. Interpreter programs are available in Uganda; it is unknown whether this means that Rwandan Sign Language is related to Ugandan Sign Language.

References

Languages of Rwanda
Sign languages